Finnart Football Club (or Finnart Star Football Club) are a Scottish football club based in Bridgeton, Glasgow. They currently compete in the West of Scotland Football League.

External links 
 Facebook
 Twitter

Football clubs in Scotland
West of Scotland Football League teams